The Treason Connecticut Whale are a professional ice hockey team based in the Premier Hockey Federation (PHF). They play in Simsbury, Connecticut at the International Skating Center of Connecticut. The team was established in 2015 as one of the four charter franchises of the National Women's Hockey League (NWHL; renamed PHF in 2021). Their name and colors pay homage to the Hartford Whalers, a former NHL and WHA franchise based in Connecticut.

History
For their first season, the Whale played home games in Stamford, Connecticut at Chelsea Piers. Chris Ardito was hired as the first general manager in franchise history, while Jake Mastel and Lisa Giovanelli coached the team. The team is the second professional hockey team to bear the Connecticut Whale name, following the American Hockey League team previously and currently known as the Hartford Wolf Pack.

Among their off-season acquisitions, the Whale signed Kaleigh Fratkin to a contract on July 1, 2015. She was the first Canadian player to sign a contract in the NWHL.

The team made its debut in the 2015–16 season. Jessica Koizumi was named first team captain in franchise history. The first game in NWHL history was a sell out on October 11, 2015 between the New York Riveters and Connecticut Whale. The Whale prevailed by a 4–1 tally as Jessica Koizumi scored the first goal in both franchise and NWHL history. In the same game, Kelli Stack had one goal and two assists, becoming the first player to record a multi-point performance. Whale goaltender Jaimie Leonoff was credited the win, capturing the game's First Star. Stack was recognized as the Second Star, and Kelly Babstock, who became the first Canadian-born player to score a goal in an NWHL regular season game, was acknowledged as the Third Star.

The Whale won their first three games in franchise history with three different goalies. In the first game, the Whale prevailed with Jaimie Leonoff, while former Quinnipiac goaltender Chelsea Laden captured the second win, and Nicole Stock played her first game in over five years to capture the third win on the road against the New York Riveters.

Prior to the team's second season, the Whale moved to the Northford Ice Pavilion in Northford, Connecticut. This lasted one season as the Whale moved to the Terry Conners Ice Rink at Cove Island Park in Stamford, Connecticut, for the 2017–18 season.

On August 20, 2018, the Whale named active player Cydney Roesler an assistant coach for the 2018–19 season making her the first player-coach in franchise history.

After two seasons at Terry Conners Ice Rink, the Whale moved again to the larger Danbury Ice Arena in Danbury, Connecticut. Former NHL enforcer Colton Orr was named as head coach for the 2019–20 season. The team was eliminated in the semifinal game by the Boston Pride, the eventual league titlist, prior to the championship being cancelled by the COVID-19 pandemic.

The following season was then delayed amidst the capacity and travel restrictions during the pandemic. The 2020–21 season eventually started on January 23, 2021, with the entire season to be played at Herb Brooks Arena in Lake Placid, New York, without fans in attendance and teams kept in isolation. However, the Metropolitan Riveters were forced to withdraw from the two-week season on January 28 after several members of the organization tested positive for COVID-19. The schedule was then adjusted to have the top three teams at the time play a round-robin tournament to determine playoff seeding with the Whale as the second seed. Connecticut then lost to the expansion Toronto Six 0–6 on January 31. The next day, the team forfeited their final game to the Minnesota Whitecaps and withdrew from the playoffs citing concerns with increased positive cases within the bubble and protecting their players from the virus. Two days later, the league suspended the season before the playoffs could commence due to several more positive tests throughout the league. The league then re-scheduled the playoffs to be held at Warrior Ice Arena in Brighton, Massachusetts, with the Whale re-entered as the third seed to face the Minnesota Whitecaps, who they would have faced regardless of the outcome of the game the Whale withdrew from in Lake Placid, in a semifinal game. The Whale then lost to the Whitecaps 7–0 in the semifinal game.

On May 10, 2021, the league announced it had sold the Whale to a new independent ownership group called Shared Hockey Enterprises (SHE), LLC, led by Tobin Kelly, reducing the league operated teams to three.

Season-by-season records

Team

Current roster 

Coaching staff and team personnel
 Head coach: Colton Orr
 Assistant coach: Jeff Devenney
 Assistant coach: Sue Merz
 Consulting coach: Jack Han
 Athletic trainer: Hailey Rock

Team captains    
 Jessica Koizumi, 2015–16
 Molly Engstrom, 2016
 Kelli Stack, 2017
 Sam Faber, 2017–18
 Emily Fluke, 2018–19
 Shannon Turner, 2019–present

Alternate captains 
 Kaleigh Fratkin, 2015–16
 Kelli Stack, 2016
 Kelly Babstock, 2016–17
 Juana Baribeau, 2017–2019
 Shannon Turner, 2017–2019
 Jordan Brickner, 2019–20
 Elena Orlando, 2019–2021
 Emma Vlasic, 2020–present
 Janine Weber, 2020–present
 Kaycie Anderson, 2021–22
 Alyssa Wohlfeiler, 2021–present
 Kennedy Marchment, 2022–present

Head coaches 
 Jake Mastel, 2015
 Heather Linstad, 2015–2017
 Ryan Equale, 2018–2019
 Colton Orr, 2019–present

General managers 
 Chris Ardito, 2015–2016
 Lisa Giovanelli, 2016–2017
 Bray Ketchum, 2019–2020
 Amy Scheer, 2020–21
 Alexis Moed, 2021–present

Draft history
Hannah Brandt from the Minnesota Golden Gophers women's ice hockey program became the first player in franchise history to be selected in the inaugural 2015 NWHL Draft. Michelle Picard was the first defenseman selected in NWHL Draft history.

2015 NWHL Draft

The following were the Whale's selections in the 2015 NWHL Draft on June 20, 2015.

2016 NWHL Draft 

The following were the Whale's selections in the 2016 NWHL Draft on June 18, 2016.

2017 NWHL Draft 

The following were the Whale's selections in the 2017 NWHL Draft on August 17, 2017.

2018 NWHL Draft 

The following were the Whale's selections in the 2018 NWHL Draft on December 19 and 20, 2018.

2020 NWHL Draft 

The following were the Whale's selections in the 2020 NWHL Draft on April 28 and 29, 2020. Connecticut held the Metropolitan Riveters fifth round pick (27th overall), as the future considerations from the trade of Maria Sorokina to the Riveters in 2019.

2021 NWHL Draft 

The following were the Whale's selections in the 2021 NWHL Draft on June 29, 2021.

Franchise milestones and statistics leaders

As of the 2023-23 season:

Awards and honors
 Grace Kleinbach, 2021 Foundation Award

References

External links

 

Connecticut Whale (PHF)
Ice hockey teams in Connecticut
Ice hockey clubs established in 2015
Women's ice hockey teams in the United States
Premier Hockey Federation teams
2015 establishments in Connecticut
Whales and humans